Peter Curtis Lamont (12 November 1929 – 18 December 2020) was a British set decorator, art director, and production designer most noted for his collaborations with filmmaker James Cameron, and for working on eighteen James Bond films, from Goldfinger (1964) to Casino Royale (2006). The only Bond film that he did not work on during that period was Tomorrow Never Dies (1997), as he was working on Cameron's Titanic (1997) at the time.  He also worked extensively as a set dresser on the Carry On series in the 1960s.

Throughout his near 60-year career, Lamont was nominated for four Academy Awards for his work on Fiddler on the Roof (1971), The Spy Who Loved Me (1977), Aliens (1986), and Titanic (1997), winning for the latter film. His memoir, The Man With the Golden Eye: Designing the James Bond Films, was published in 2016.<ref>'[https://www.penguinrandomhouse.com/books/554253/the-man-with-the-golden-eye-designing-the-james-bond-films-by-peter-lamont/ 'The Man With the Golden Eye, Penguin Random House (2016)]</ref>

James Bond series

DraftsmanGoldfinger (1964)  (uncredited)

Set decoratorThunderball (1965) (uncredited)You Only Live Twice (1967)On Her Majesty's Secret Service (1969)Diamonds Are Forever (1971)

Art directorLive and Let Die (1973)The Man with the Golden Gun (1974)The Spy Who Loved Me (1977)Moonraker (1979) — Visual effects

Production designer
James Bond 007For Your Eyes Only (1981)Octopussy (1983)A View to a Kill (1985)The Living Daylights (1987)Licence to Kill (1989)GoldenEye (1995)The World Is Not Enough (1999)Die Another Day (2002)Casino Royale (2006)

Works with James CameronAliens (1986)True Lies (1994)Titanic (1997)

Selected other filmographyChitty Chitty Bang Bang (1968) — Assistant set directorFiddler on the Roof (1971) — Set decoratorEve of Destruction (1991) — Production designerWing Commander'' (1999) — Production designer

References

External links
British Film Designers Guild

English art directors
Best Art Direction Academy Award winners
1929 births
2020 deaths
British film designers
British set decorators